The prime minister (literally translating to "Minister of State") is the head of government of Sweden. The prime minister and their cabinet (the government) exercise executive authority in the Kingdom of Sweden and are subject to the Parliament of Sweden. The prime minister is nominated by the Speaker of the Riksdag and elected by the chamber by simple majority, using negative parliamentarianism. The Riksdag holds elections every four years, in the even year between leap years.

Unlike most prime ministers in parliamentary systems, the prime minister is both de jure and de facto chief executive. This is because the Instrument of Government explicitly vests executive power in the government, of which the prime minister is the leader.

History
Before 1876, when the office of a single prime minister was created, Sweden did not have a head of government separate from the king. Historically though, the most senior member of the Privy Council (during the absolute rule this was the Lord High Chancellor) had certain similarities to the office of a head of government. This was most evident during the so-called Age of Liberty from 1718 to 1772, when powers of the Monarch were greatly reduced and the President of the Privy Council became the most powerful political figure in Sweden.

At the adoption of the new Instrument of Government of 1809, the two offices of Prime Minister for Justice and Prime Minister for Foreign Affairs were created, though their roles were no more than just the heads of their respective ministries. When the office of the prime minister was created in 1876, the prime ministers for justice and foreign affairs were thus subsequently demoted to Minister for Justice and Minister for Foreign Affairs. Unlike the minister for justice, the minister for foreign affairs did however continue to be styled as "Excellency", an honour shared only with the Prime Minister. 
After 1917, it was no longer possible for a monarch to appoint the prime minister and the councillors of state (cabinet ministers) at their own discretion, or keep them in office against the will of the Riksdag. From that time onward, while the king still formally appointed the prime minister, in practice he was required to appoint the leader of the majority party in the Riksdag, or the leader of the senior partner in the majority coalition.  While the provision in the Instrument of Government stating that "the King alone shall govern the realm" remained unchanged, it was now understood that the King was required to exercise his powers through the ministers and act on their advice. Over time, the ministers came to de facto exercise the Royal prerogatives. However, the Swedish term used for the Government during this period, still was Kungl. Maj:t, an abbreviation of Kunglig Majestät.

Until 1974, the executive authority in Sweden had been exercised through the King in Council. Constitutional reform provided a new Instrument of Government which de jure established the parliamentary system and created a cabinet government with constitutional powers not derived from the Crown. At the same time, it stripped the monarchy of even nominal political powers, making the cabinet the country's executive authority in both name and in fact.

Duties

The Instrument of Government requires that the prime minister appoint a member of the cabinet as Deputy Prime Minister, to perform the duties of the prime minister if the prime minister cannot. However, if a deputy prime minister is absent or has not been appointed, the senior minister in the cabinet becomes acting head of government.  If more than one minister has equal tenure, the eldest assumes the position (see Swedish governmental line of succession for the present governmental line of succession).

Constitutionally, the prime minister's position is stronger than that of his or her counterparts in Denmark and Norway. Since 1975, the prime minister has been both de jure and de facto chief executive, with powers and duties specifically enumerated in the Instrument of Government. In the two neighboring Scandinavian monarchies, the monarch is the nominal chief executive, but is bound by convention to act on the advice of the ministers.  However, the so-called Torekov Compromise reached in 1971 by the major political parties, codified with the Instrument of Government that went into effect in 1975, stripped the Swedish monarch of even a nominal role in governmental affairs, thus codifying actual practices that had been in place since the definitive establishment of parliamentary government in 1917.

Process

Appointment 
To appoint a new prime minister, the speaker of the Riksdag holds consultations with party leaders to propose a candidate to be submitted for approval to the Riksdag.

The speaker's proposed candidate is then elected through negative parliamentarism. In practice, this means that the prime minister nominee is confirmed if fewer than 175 MPs vote 'no', regardless of the number of 'yes' votes or abstentions. This is described as being "tolerated" by a majority of the Riksdag.

After approval by the Riksdag, the new prime minister-designate must inform the Riksdag which ministers are chosen to make up the new government. 

The formal change of government, and thus the start of the term for the new Prime Minister takes place at a Council of State at the Royal Palace. This is a government meeting chaired by the King, currently Carl XVI Gustaf. During this meeting, the speaker gives an account of the nomination and election process. The king then announces that a change of government has taken place, finalising the appointment of the new Prime Minister and their government.

Resignation 
Whenever a prime minister resigns, dies, or is forced from office by the Riksdag, the speaker of the Riksdag asks the prime minister (or their deputy) to keep the government as a caretaker government until the new government takes office. 

With the exception of the prime minister, cabinet ministers do not need the approval of the Riksdag, but they can be forced to resign by a vote of no confidence. If the prime minister is forced by a vote of no confidence to resign, the entire cabinet falls, and the process of electing a new prime minister starts. The prime minister can dissolve the Riksdag, even after receiving a vote of no confidence, except during the first three months after an election.

Amenities

Office and residences
The government offices, including the prime minister's office, are located at Rosenbad in central Stockholm, straight across the water from the Riksdag building on Helgeandsholmen.

In 1991 Sager House (or the "Sager Palace" as it was previously called) was acquired, and since 1995 it has served as the private residence of the prime minister.

Harpsund, a manor house in Flen Municipality, Södermanland County, has served as a country residence for the prime minister since 1953. The manor is also frequently used for governmental conferences and informal summits between the government, industry and organisations in Sweden.

Salary
The salaries of the cabinet ministers, including the prime minister, is decided by and is the subject of annual review by the Statsrådsarvodesnämnden ("Cabinet Ministers' Salary Committee") of the Riksdag. Since 1 January 2022 the prime minister's monthly salary is 184,000 SEK.

Office and residences

See also
Deputy Prime Minister of Sweden
Swedish governmental line of succession
List of prime ministers of Sweden
List of spouses of Swedish prime ministers

References

Bibliography

External links
Prime Minister's Office, official website

1876 establishments in Sweden